Kenny Robinson is a stand-up comic, actor, and occasional DJ.  Born in Winnipeg, Manitoba, he moved to Toronto in 1983 to pursue a career as a comedian.

Career
In 1998, he was chosen by Now Magazine as their Comic of the Year.

Since 1995, he has hosted The Nubian Disciples All-Black Comedy Revue, a monthly showcase of Black comics at Yuk-Yuks in Toronto.  The show has featured performers such as Ronnie Edwards, Mista Mo, and Gavin Stephens; and has been attended by celebrities such Russell Peters, Dave Chappelle, Tommy Davidson, and Vince Carter.

He has appeared in his own late-night TV series, After Hours (2001), as well as the Gemini-nominated CBC special Thick and Thin with Ronnie Edwards.

He also played the recurring character Jellybean on the series Doc with Billy Ray Cyrus.

From 2003 to 2005, Robinson played the recurring character "Mickey" on Radio Free Roscoe.

In 2018, Robinson was a candidate for the Ontario Legislature in the Mississauga—Lakeshore riding, representing the None of the Above Party.  He was 5th among 8 candidates who ran.

References

External links

1957 births
Living people
Black Canadian male actors
Canadian male comedians
Canadian stand-up comedians
Canadian male television actors
Male actors from Winnipeg
Canadian people of Barbadian descent
Comedians from Manitoba
Black Canadian comedians
Canadian Comedy Award winners